Joe Zarb (born 17 November 1964) is a retired Maltese football striker.

Club career
Born in Żabbar and nicknamed Brimba (Spider), Zarb netted 140 league goals in 281 matches for St. George's, Ħamrun Spartans and Valletta and was the Maltese Premier League top goalscorer 4 times.

International career
He made his debut for Malta in an October 1989 friendly match against Austria, in which he also scored, and earned a total of 10 caps scoring 1 goal. His final international was a March 1994 friendly against Slovakia.

References

External links
 

1964 births
Living people
People from Żabbar
Association football midfielders
Maltese footballers
Malta international footballers
St. George's F.C. players
Ħamrun Spartans F.C. players
Valletta F.C. players
Gozo F.C. players
Żurrieq F.C. players
Maltese Premier League players
Maltese Challenge League players